Statistics of Nadeshiko League Cup in the 2012 season.

Overview
Nippon TV Beleza won the championship.

Results

2012

Qualifying round

Group A

Group B

Final round

Semifinals
INAC Kobe Leonessa 5-1 Iga FC Kunoichi
Nippon TV Beleza 3-0 Albirex Niigata Ladies

Final
INAC Kobe Leonessa 2-3 Nippon TV Beleza

References

Nadeshiko League Cup
2012 in Japanese women's football